Ceromitia cuneella is a moth of the  family Adelidae or fairy longhorn moths. It was described by Walsingham in 1891. It is found in South Africa.

References

Moths described in 1891
Adelidae
Endemic moths of South Africa